Philip of Artois (November 1269 – 11 September 1298) was the son of Robert II of Artois, Count of Artois, and Amicie de Courtenay. He was the Lord of Conches, Nonancourt, and Domfront.

He married Blanche of Brittany, daughter of John II, Duke of Brittany, and had the following children:
 Margaret (1285–1311), married in 1301 Louis, Count of Évreux
 Robert III of Artois (1287–1342)
 Isabelle (1288–1344), a nun at Poissy
 Joan of Artois (1289 – aft. 1350), married Gaston I, Count of Foix, in Senlis in 1301
 Othon (died 2 November 1291)
 Marie of Artois (1291 – 22 January 1365, Wijnendaele), Lady of Merode, married in 1309 in Paris John I, Marquis of Namur
 Catherine (1296–1368, Normandy), married John II of Ponthieu, Count of Aumale

He served under his father at the Battle of Furnes, where he was wounded. He never recovered, and died of the effects over a year later. He was buried in the now-demolished church of the Couvent des Jacobins in Paris. His premature death led to a legal battle later, when the County of Artois was left to his elder sister Mahaut of Artois rather than his eldest son Robert III.

Footnotes

References

External links 
 Philip of Artois on Medieval Lands Project site

Artois, Philip of
Artois, Philip of
House of Artois
13th-century French nobility